Tool Box is the fifth studio album from American country music artist Aaron Tippin. It features the singles "That's as Close as I'll Get to Loving You", "Without Your Love", "Everything I Own" and "How's the Radio Know". "That's as Close as I'll Get to Loving You" reached Number One on the Billboard country charts in 1995, giving Tippin the second Number One of his career. "Without Your Love" reached #22, and the other two singles both missed Top 40 in the U.S. The album was certified gold by the RIAA.

"You've Always Got Me" was previously recorded by Pearl River on their 1994 album Pearl River, and "Ten Pound Hammer" would later be recorded by Barbara Mandrell on her 1997 album It Works for Me. Additionally, "I Can Help" is a cover of a song originally released by country-pop artist Billy Swan in 1973. "Country Boy's Tool Box" is also reprised from Tippin's 1994 album Lookin' Back at Myself.

Track listing

Personnel
As listed in liner notes.
Stuart Duncan - fiddle
Sonny Garrish - pedal steel guitar
Steve Gibson - acoustic guitar, electric guitar
Rob Hajacos - fiddle
Ray Herndon - background vocals
John Hobbs - keyboards
Mitch Humphries - keyboards
Brent Mason - electric guitar
Bobby Ogdin - keyboards
Michael Rhodes - bass guitar
John Wesley Ryles - background vocals
Hank Singer - fiddle
Aaron Tippin - lead vocals
Billy Joe Walker Jr. - acoustic guitar
Biff Watson - acoustic guitar
Dennis Wilson - background vocals
Lonnie Wilson - drums
Glenn Worf - bass guitar
Reggie Young - electric guitar

Chart performance

References

1995 albums
RCA Records albums
Aaron Tippin albums